There are several categories of respiratory drugs, each specific to a drug's purpose and mode of action. The following is a list of key pharmaceuticals in the prevention and treatment of respiratory-related ailments.

Adrenergic (Sympathomimetic) Bronchodilators

Ultra Short-Acting 

Epinephrine
Racemic epinephrine
Isoetharine

Short-Acting 

Metaproterenol
Albuterol
Pirbuterol
Levalbuterol

Long-Acting 

Salmeterol
Formoterol
Arformoterol

Anticholinergic (Parasympatholytic) Bronchodilators 
Ipratropium bromide
Tiotropium bromide

Xanthines 
Theophylline
Oxtriphylline
Aminophylline
Dyphylline

Mucus-controlling agents 
Acetylcysteine (10%,20%)
Dornase alfa
Hypertonic saline (3-10%)

Surfactants 
Beractant
Calfactant
Poractant alfa

Corticosteroids 
Beclomethasone (dipropionate)
Triamcinolone acetonide
Flunisolide (hemihydrate)
Fluticasone (propionate)
Budesonide
Mometasone furoate

Nonsteroidal Antiasthma agents

Cromolyn-like agents 
Cromolyn sodium
Nedocromil sodium

Antileukotrienes 
Zafirlukast
Montelukast
Zileuton

Monoclonal Antibody 
Omalizumab

Aerosolized Antiinfective agents 
Pentamidine isethionate
Ribavirin
Tobramycin
Zanamivir

Smoking Cessation Drugs 
Nicotine transdermal (patch)
Nicotine polacrilex
Bupropion
Varenicline

Other Important Respiratory Medications 
α1-Proteinase Inhibitors
Nitric Oxide (gas)
Heliox (gas)
Epoprostenol

References

Respiratory agents